Ignatius bar Wahib was the Syriac Orthodox Patriarch of Mardin from 1293 until his death in 1333.

Biography
Joseph Badr al-Din Zakhi bar Wahib was born at Korinsha in the Tur Abdin in the 13th century, and was the son of Abraham. He was raised at Mardin, and became a monk at the nearby monastery of Saint Ananias. Patriarch Philoxenus I Nemrud consecrated bar Wahib as archbishop of Mardin in 1287, upon which he assumed the name Ignatius.

He was elected as the patriarch of Mardin at a synod at the monastery of Saint Ananias at the beginning of January 1293, and was consecrated by Ignatius, archbishop of Qartmin. In 1303 or 1304, he convened a synod at the monastery of Saint Ananias, in which he issued ten canons, and was attended by five bishops. He was credited with performing three miracles at Mardin that were reportedly recognised by both Christians and Muslims. Bar Wahib served as patriarch of Mardin until his death in 1333. As patriarch, Bar Wahib ordained twenty bishops.

Works
Bar Wahib wrote two books on Syriac and Arabic phonetics, and a liturgy in 1304. As well as this, he wrote a treatise on the definition of prayers and rituals.

References
Notes

Citations

Bibliography

Patriarchs of Mardin
Syriac writers
13th-century births
13th-century Oriental Orthodox archbishops
14th-century Oriental Orthodox archbishops
1333 deaths
13th-century writers
14th-century writers
Miracle workers